The 1988 Chilean telethon was the eighth version of the solidarity campaign conducted in Chile, which took place on 2 and 3 December 1988. The theme of this version was "It's Everybody's Task," and the official theme song Soy tu amigo (I'm your friend), was sung by Miguel Zabaleta and Cecilia Echenique. The poster boy was Rodrigo Caceres, who is remembered for having memorized all the companies sponsoring the event.

The morning newscast was in charge of Radio Cooperativa, they therefore resorted to the announcer Sergio Campos, for the first time, on television. He read the news as if he was in a radio studio. One of the stories of this edition was that the children's section of the programme was issued fully recorded, unlike previous years.

This campaign initially seemed likely to fail, the slowness of the Chileans to donate made the program directors lengthen the schedule by about 1 hour, thus giving time to reach the goal at 0030 on Sunday, 4 December. The amount collected was: CL$ 525,801,100 later after the telethon ended the figure of CL$  711,712,019 was reached

The telethon was held two months after the well-remembered and historic plebiscite of 5 October that year and was the last telethon which took place under the military government of Augusto Pinochet. And of course, it marked Teleton's 10th year.

Sponsors

Artists

Nationals 
  Juan Antonio Labra
  Los Huasos Quincheros
  Gloria Simonetti
  Luis Jara
   Andrea Tessa
  Alberto Plaza
  Peter Rock
  Patricia Frías
  Miguel Piñera
  Patricio Renán
  Eduardo Fuentes
    Roberto Vander
  Sergio Lillo
  Roberto Viking Valdés
  Jorge Eduardo
  Wildo
  Irene Llanos
  Lorena
  Pachuco
  Alejandro De Rosas
  María Inés Naveillán
  Claudia Muñoz
  Cristóbal
  Eduardo Gatti
  Keko Yungue
  José Luis Arce
  Ginette Acevedo
  Mónica De Calixto
  Lucho Muñoz
  Álvaro Scaramelli

International 
  Chayanne
  Sandro
  Fito Páez
  Al Di Meola
  Víctor Manuel
  Ángela Carrasco
  Amaya Uranga
  Las Primas
  Franco
  Nito Mestre
    Miguel Bosé
  Viento y Marea
  Sandra Mihanovich
  Celeste Carvallo
  Orlando Netti
  Braulio

Comedians 
 José Luis Giogia
 Coco Legrand
 Ricardo Meruane
 Jorge Navarrete
 Pepe Tapia
 Checho Hirane
 Álvaro Salas
 Jorge Cruz
 Carlos Helo
 Sergio Feito
 Lucho Arenas
 Clavel
 Gigi Martin

Magazine 
 BAFOCHI
 Hugo Urrutia
 Gloria Benavides
 Tamare Tahiti
 Mario Buqueño
 Gerardo Parra
 Ramón Núñez

In Children's Section 
 El Profesor Rossa
 Patio Plum
 Cachureos
 Pipiripao
 Alejandro Rojas

In Adult's Section 
 Bambi
 Cristina Tocco
 Maripepa Nieto

Transmission 
 UCV Televisión
 Televisión Nacional de Chile
 Canal 9 Señal 2 de Televisión Nacional de Chile
 Universidad de Chile Televisión
 Universidad Católica de Chile Televisión
 Telenorte
 Red TV Cable

External links 
 1988 Chilean telethon - Photos

Telethon
Chilean telethons